The 1982–83 Polish Cup was the 29th edition of the annual Polish football knockout tournament. It started on the 23 July 1982 and finished on 22 June 1983. The finalists were 2nd division Piast Gliwice and 3rd division Lechia Gdańsk, with Lechia Gdańsk winning the Polish Cup for the first time after winning the final 2–1.

Round 1
First round fixtures.

|}

Round 2
Second round fixtures.

|}

Round 3
Third round fixtures.

|}

Round of 32
Round of 32 fixtures.
The teams from the Ekstraklasa are introduced. Due to the competitions rules they are all drawn away from home in this round.

|}

Round of 16
Round of 16 fixtures.

|}

Quarter-finals
Quarter final fixtures.

|}

Semi-finals
Semi final fixtures.

|}

Final

The Polish Cup was won by Lechia Gdańsk.

Bracket

References

Polish Cup
Cup
Polish Cup seasons